Habakkuk 3 is the third (and the last) chapter of the Book of Habakkuk in the Hebrew Bible or the Old Testament of the Christian Bible. This book contains the prophecies attributed to the prophet Habakkuk, and is a part of the Book of the Twelve Minor Prophets. This chapter records "Habakkuk's song", a poetic psalm "extolling God's triumphs."

Text
The original text was written in Hebrew language. This chapter is divided into 19 verses.

Textual witnesses
Some early manuscripts containing the text of this chapter in Hebrew are of the Masoretic Text tradition, which includes the Codex Cairensis (895), the Petersburg Codex of the Prophets (916), Aleppo Codex (10th century), Codex Leningradensis (1008). Fragments containing all verses of this chapter in Hebrew were found among the Dead Sea Scrolls, that is, Wadi Murabba'at Minor Prophets (Mur88; MurXIIProph; 75-100 CE) with extant verses 1–19.

There is also a translation into Koine Greek known as the Septuagint (with a different verse numbering), made in the last few centuries BC. Extant ancient manuscripts of the Septuagint version include Codex Vaticanus (B; B; 4th century), Codex Sinaiticus (S; BHK: S; 4th century), Codex Alexandrinus (A; A; 5th century) and Codex Marchalianus (Q; Q; 6th century). Fragments containing parts of this chapter in Greek were found among the Dead Sea Scrolls, that is, Naḥal Ḥever 8Ḥev1 (8ḤevXIIgr); late 1st century BCE) with extant verses 8–15.

Verse 1 
 A prayer of Habakkuk the prophet upon Shigionoth. (KJV)
 "Shigionoth" (Hebrew: שגינות from the root singular word שִׁגָּיוֹן ), the title could be rendered "wild, passionate song, with rapid changes of rhythm" or "a hymn."

Verse 19 
 The Lord God is my strength, and he will make my feet like hinds' feet,
 and he will make me to walk upon mine high places.
 To the chief singer on my stringed instruments. (KJV)

Masoretic text:
 
 

Transliteration:
 YHWH a·do·nai khi·li wai·ya·syem rag·lai ka·'ai·ya·lot 
 we·'al ba·mo·tai yad·ri·khe·ni
lam·na·tze·akh bin·gi·no·tai.

Verse 19 note 
 The phrase "make my feet like hinds' feet" is similar to the phrases in Psalm 18:33 or 

Discussion 
Some scholars suggest that Chapter 3 may be a later independent addition to the book, in part because it is not included among the Dead Sea Scrolls.  However, this chapter does appear in all copies of the Septuagint, as well as in texts from as early as the 3rd century BC.  This final chapter is a poetic praise of God, and has some similarities with texts found in the Book of Daniel. However, the fact that the third chapter is written in a different style, as a liturgical piece, does not necessarily mean that Habakkuk was not also its author.  Its omission from the Dead Sea Scrolls is attributed to the inability of the Qumran sect to fit Habakkuk's theology with their own narrow viewpoint.

See also 
 Related Bible parts: 2 Samuel 22, Psalm 4, Psalm 6, Psalm 7, Psalm 18, Psalm 54, Psalm 55, Psalm 67, Psalm 76.

References

Sources

External links 

Historic manuscripts
 The Commentary on Habakkuk Scroll, The Digital Dead Sea Scrolls, hosted by the Israel Museum, Jerusalem.

Jewish translations
 Chavakuk – Habakkuk (Judaica Press) translation [with Rashi's commentary] at Chabad.org

Christian translations
Online Bible at GospelHall.org (ESV, KJV, Darby, American Standard Version, Bible in Basic English)
  Various versions

Further information
 A Brief Introduction to The Prophecy of Habakkuk for Contemporary Readers (Christian Perspective)
 Introduction to the book of Habakkuk from the NIV Study Bible
 Introduction to the Book of HabakkukForward Movement Publications

03